Bleachers is an American rock band from New Jersey and the official stage name of songwriter and record producer Jack Antonoff. Bleachers' rock music is heavily influenced by the late '80s, early '90s, and the high school-based films of John Hughes while still using modern production techniques. Their debut single "I Wanna Get Better" was released in February 2014, followed by three studio albums: Strange Desire (2014), Gone Now (2017), and Take the Sadness Out of Saturday Night (2021).

Career

2013–2016: Origins and Strange Desire 
While on the road with his band, Fun, Antonoff began working on a new project during his time in different cities. For about a year he kept the project a secret until February 18, 2014, when the first single "I Wanna Get Better" was released along with the launch of Bleachers' website, social media profiles, and a selection of tour dates. News of Bleachers was first publicly announced in a Facebook post by Brooklyn music studio Mission Sound in May 2013.

About making the first Bleachers album, Antonoff said, "I spent the past year working on the music but not talking about it, and eventually it became this psychotic alter-ego situation, where it was second nature to have this part of me that no one knew about. Except for a small group of people, most of which happened to be members of my immediate family, no one was aware that this music, or this album even existed... even though it existed so deeply to me." Antonoff also stated that Bleachers was never meant to be a departure from his position in Fun., and that he will remain in the band.

Bleachers' debut album Strange Desire was released July 10, 2014, from RCA Records. Variance Magazine called the single "Rollercoaster" a "brilliant summer anthem." Bleachers went on their debut Come Alive! tour, which features Night Terrors of 1927 and Joywave as opening acts, from March to April 2015. From there, they went on the Strange Desire World Tour from July to November of that same year. They juggled this with the Charli and Jack Do America Tour, a tour co-headlined by Bleachers and Charli XCX.

On September 25, 2015, Bleachers released Terrible Thrills, Vol. 2, a sequel to Strange Desire. The album contained songs from Strange Desire being covered by numerous female artists with modified tunes. When asked about the album, Antonoff told Billboard “I hear my songs being sung by females before I change them and make them into my voice. The whole heart of this idea is for people to hear the album the way I hear it in my head, reinterpreted by the artists who sort of inspired it to be written in the first place.” Covers were contributed from artists such as Sara Bareilles, Charli XCX, and Sia. The band appeared as the fictional band Baby Goya and The Nuclear Winters in the 2015 film Hello, My Name Is Doris.

2017–2019: Gone Now and Love, Simon 

Bleachers' second album Gone Now was released June 2, 2017. Its lead single "Don't Take the Money" has been described by Atwood Magazine as "an epic uplifting pop-rock anthem ultimately about how when love is real, its worth everything that comes along with it". In celebration of the album release, he brought his childhood bedroom on tour with him. He had it dismantled and rebuilt inside of a portable trailer. During May and June concerts, fans could enter the "moving, living art exhibit" and listen to the album prior to its official release. Antonoff explained in a press release, saying "when I thought about where this album was coming from and what it’s kissing goodbye I thought of this room. I wished I could play the album for people who care about Bleachers in this space that it is coming from and leaving." The band was on its Gone Now Era: Part 1 tour from September to November 2017. The tour featured Tove Stryke, Bishop Briggs, and Tangerine as openers.

In September 2017, Bleachers performed on MTV Unplugged at The Stone Pony in Asbury Park, New Jersey. The live session was later released as an album, also entitled MTV Unplugged. The album features 11 tracks from both Gone Now and Strange Desire and was released November 10, 2017. Antonoff produced the soundtrack of Love, Simon, released on March 16, 2018. He contributed five songs, with four being credited to Bleachers—"Alfie's Song (Not So Typical Love Song)", "Rollercoaster", "Keeping a Secret", and "Wild Heart"— and one credited to his real name, a duet with MØ titled "Never Fall in Love". Throughout 2019, Bleachers released the third volume of Terrible Thrills in a series of four vinyl records, each featuring covers of songs from Gone Now by female artists as well as new demos by Bleachers.

2020–present: Take the Sadness Out of Saturday Night and upcoming fourth studio album 
In late 2019, Antonoff began recording the third Bleachers album. During this time the band embarked on a three-day "mini-tour" called the "I Love Making This Album but I'm Also Losing My Mind in Here & Need to Come Out and Play" Tour. On January 6, 2020, Antonoff announced on Twitter that a new Bleachers album would come within the year. In May, Bleachers was featured on Carly Rae Jepsen's song "Comeback" which was the first official release of the band in nearly two years.

On November 16, 2020, Bleachers released the first two singles from Take the Sadness Out of Saturday Night, "45" and "Chinatown", the latter featuring Bruce Springsteen. The same day it was announced that the album would be released in 2021. "Stop Making This Hurt", the third single, was released on May 18, 2021. Take the Sadness Out of Saturday Night was released on July 30, 2021. Bleachers announced a North American tour for Take the Sadness Out of Saturday Night in May 2021. On October 28, 2021, Bleachers announced on Facebook that they will be performing two shows in March 2022 at Roadrunner, Boston dedicated to their first two albums: Strange Desire and Gone Now. On the January 15, 2022, episode of Saturday Night Live, which was hosted by Ariana DeBose, Bleachers replaced the originally scheduled Roddy Ricch.

On January 1, 2022, Jack Antonoff tweeted "I am going to put out a bleachers album this year". Later that month they announced "The 2022 Tour" featuring openers Allison Ponthier, Blu DeTiger, The Lemon Twigs, Beabadoobee, Charly Bliss, and Wolf Alice. However, no album was released in 2022. In October, the band featured on a remix of Taylor Swift's "Anti-Hero".

Live band members 
While Antonoff performs the majority of the instrumentation in-studio, he is accompanied by a band for live performances.

 Jack Antonoff – lead vocals, guitar, bass, keyboards, programming, synthesizers, samples 
 Evan Smith – keyboards, synthesizers, saxophone, backing vocals 
 Mikey Hart – guitar, keyboards, synthesizers, piano, bass, backing vocals 
 Sean Hutchinson – drums, sampling pad, synthesizers, bass, backing vocals 
 Mike Riddleberger – drums, sampling pad, backing vocals 
 Zem Audu – keyboards, saxophone, backing vocals

Discography

Studio albums

Live albums

Compilation albums

EPs

Singles

Promotional singles

Guest appearances
{| class="wikitable plainrowheaders" style="text-align:center;" border="1"
|+Guest appearances credited to Bleachers
! scope="col"  style="width:16em;"| Title
! scope="col" style="width:4em;"| Year
! scope="col" style="width:8em;"| Other Artist(s)
! scope="col" style="width:18em;"| Album
|-
! scope="row"|"Alfie's Song (Not So Typical Love Song)"
|rowspan="2"|2018
|rowspan="2" 
|rowspan="2"|Love, Simon (Original Motion Picture Soundtrack)
|-
! scope="row"|"Keeping a Secret"
|-
! scope="row"|"Comeback"
|2020
|Carly Rae Jepsen
|Dedicated Side B
|-
! scope="row"|"Instant Karma!"
|2022
|
|Minions: Rise of Gru (Original Motion Picture Soundtrack)
|-
! scope="row"|"Anti-Hero"
|2022
|Taylor Swift
|
|-
! scope="row"|"Margaret"
|2023
|Lana Del Rey
|Did You Know That There's a Tunnel Under Ocean Blvd
|}

 Notes 

Tours
HeadliningStrange Desire World Tour (2014)Come Alive! Tour (2015)Charli and Jack Do America Tour (with Charli XCX) (2015)Gone Now Era Tour (2017-2018)I Love Making This Album but I'm Also Losing My Mind in Here & Need to Come Out and Play Mini-Tour (2019)Take the Sadness Out of Saturday Night Tour (2021)How Dare You Want Tour (2022)

OpeningTour Four'' (with Paramore) (2018)

References

External links 
 
 

American pop music groups
Musical groups from New York City
RCA Records artists